Blair MacIntyre is a Professor and Director of the Augmented Environments Lab at Georgia Institute of Technology working in the field of augmented reality.

Career
After completing his doctorate at Columbia University in 1998, MacIntyre moved to the Georgia Institute of Technology where he founded and was appointed director of the newly-formed Augmented Environments Lab. In 2010 MacIntyre was named as the director of the Qualcomm Augmented Reality Game Studio. Currently, MacIntyre works as a Principal Research Scientist in Mozilla's Emerging Technologies team.

As the director of the KHARMA project, MacIntyre developed the Argon augmented reality browser, which was released for the iPhone in 2011.

Selected publications
 Feiner, S., MacIntyre, B., and Seligmann, D. "Knowledge-based augmented reality". Communications of the ACM, 36(7), July 1993, 52-62.

References

External links
 Blair MacIntyre, Georgia Institute of Technology

Year of birth missing (living people)
Living people
Columbia University alumni
Augmented reality
Georgia Tech faculty
Computer scientists